Mahadevan may refer to:

People 
Anand Mahadevan (born 1979), Indian-Canadian writer
Anant Mahadevan, actor and director of Marathi and Hindi films and television serials in India
Iravatham Mahadevan (1930–2018), Indian epigraphist, specializing on the Indus script and Early Tamil epigraphy
K. V. Mahadevan (1918–2001), south Indian music composer
Kumar Mahadevan (born 1959), Indian chef, restaurateur, and media personality
Lakshminarayanan Mahadevan, Indian-American mathematician and scientist at Harvard University
Mahadevan (actor) (born 1961), Indian actor who made his debut in Pithamagan (2003)
Mahadevan Sathasivam (1915–1977), Sri Lankan cricketer
Mahesh Mahadevan (1955–2002), Indian film composer in the 1990s
Nithyasree Mahadevan (born 1973), Carnatic musician and playback singer
Rajan Mahadevan (born 1957), numerically gifted memorist born in Madras, India
Raman Mahadevan (born 1978), Indian playback singer, known for his Bollywood songs
S. Mahadevan (1904–1957), Ceylon Tamil businessman
Shankar Mahadevan (born 1967), Indian music composer and singer
Siddharth Mahadevan, Indian film composer
Sowmya Mahadevan, singer
T.M.P. Mahadevan (1911–1983)
TS Mahadevan (born 1957), Indian Kerala state cricketer

Characters 
Major Mahadevan, protagonist in the Major Mahadevan film series

Films 
C. I. Mahadevan 5 Adi 4 Inchu, 2004 Malayalam comedy thriller film directed by K. K. Haridas
Sahadevan Mahadevan, Tamil film starring Mohan, released in 1988

See also
Mahadev (disambiguation)
Mahadeva (disambiguation)
Mahadevi
Mahidevran (1500s–1581)

Indian surnames